Nick Swardson's Pretend Time is a TV sketch comedy show created by and starring actor and comedian Nick Swardson. The show premiered on Tuesday, October 12, 2010, at 10 p.m. EST on Comedy Central and ran for two seasons, with the final first-run episode airing November 16, 2011.

Overview 
Each episode would begin with Swardson doing stand-up comedy on stage, in front of an audience at a comedy club.  He would tell jokes and discuss a topic which would be relevant to the episode.  This would usually be something random about himself or about the show.  The episode would then cut away to several pretaped sketches.

The show featured comedic sketches, such as Wheelchair Cat, a masturbating sniper, and a parody of Nightmare on Elm Street involving incest-related dreams.  Each episode from the first season included appearances from an animated character named Gay Robot, who originally appeared on Adam Sandler's comedy album Shh...Don't Tell.  Gay Robot was voiced by Nick Swardson.

All of the episode titles were named after Nick's favorite line from each episode. For instance, in the season one finale, a house owner asks their guest if they know what the address of the house is, and the guest replies sarcastically with "Um... I don't know... Blah Blah Blah Main Street?" The latter part of the line was chosen as the title for the seventh episode of the first season.

The show was produced by Adam Sandler's Happy Madison Productions, and comedian Horatio Sanz was one of the producers.

On September 28, 2011, a 'Clip Show' episode was aired featuring the most popular skits from the first season.

On February 6, 2012, Swardson announced through his Facebook account that there would be no more episodes made.  Reruns of the show still air sporadically on Comedy Central.

Episodes

Season 1 (2010)

Season 2 (2011)

References

External links
Official Website on Comedy Central
Nick Swardson's Pretend Time Full Episodes Guides on TVGuide.com
 

Comedy Central original programming
2010s American parody television series
2010s American sketch comedy television series
2010 American television series debuts
2011 American television series endings
Television series by Happy Madison Productions